("Wind in the coastal pines") was one of 32  destroyers built for the Imperial Japanese Navy (IJN) in the first decade of the 20th century.

Design and description
The Kamikaze-class destroyers were improved versions of the preceding . The Kamikazes were powered by two vertical triple-expansion steam engines, each driving one shaft using steam produced by four Kampon water-tube boilers. Their crew consisted of 70 officers and ratings.

The main armament of the Kamikaze-class ships consisted of two 40-calibre quick-firing (QF)  12 cwt guns on single mounts; the forward gun was located on superstructure, but the aft gun was at the stern. Four 28-calibre QF three-inch 8 cwt guns on single mounts were positioned abreast the superstructure, two in each broadside. The ships were also armed with two single rotating mounts for  torpedoes between the superstructure and the stern gun.

Construction and career 
Matsukaze was launched at Kawasaki's shipyard in Kobe on 23 December 1906 and completed on 16 February 1907. The ship saw service in World War I and participated in the Siberian Expedition. She was decommissioned on 1 April 1924 and subsequently broken up for scrap.

Notes

Citations

Books

 

Kamikaze-class destroyers (1905)
1906 ships
World War I destroyers of Japan
Ships built by Kawasaki Heavy Industries